Christian Wahl is a public artwork by Italian artist Gaetano Trentanove located in Wahl Park, which is in Milwaukee, Wisconsin, United States. The bronze bust of Milwaukee businessman Christian Wahl was created in 1903, and is set atop a red granite pedestal. Altogether it measures 8 feet in height.

Description
The bronze bust of Christian Wahl depicts a kindly balding older gentleman sporting a beard and mustache, and wearing an overcoat, suit and tie. The sculpture sits on a red granite base with an inscription on the back stating: He gave/ his ripest years and study/ to the parks/ rewarded alive/ by/ grateful remembrance. This inscription is signed. There is an inscription on the front of the base that states: In memory of Christian Wahl/ born February 12, 1829/ died October 19, 1901. It is located in Wahl Park, on the north side of Milwaukee, and is administered by the Milwaukee County, Department of Parks, Recreation and Culture.

Historical information
Christian Wahl was a wealthy businessman often referred to as the father of Milwaukee's public parks because he led most of the planning of the county's park system. Wahl was born in Bavaria in 1829 and moved with his family to a farm 5 miles south of Milwaukee in 1848. After traveling extensively, he settled in Chicago where he joined his brother in the glue business. Wahl served on Chicago's city council and board of education. Upon retiring, he moved back to Milwaukee, purchasing a home on Prospect Avenue. Wahl's home soon became the center of Milwaukee's German-American society, as he often hosted musical and literary events. "During the last years of his life, as a wealthy, retired businessman, Wahl was president of the first City Park Board in the board's first decade. His strong leadership was instrumental in the development of the city's park system and he took a deep personal interest in the completion of Lake Park." When Wahl died in 1901, Der Herald, Milwaukee's German-language newspaper, stated that his altruistic labor deserved a monument, and the city's citizens agreed.

The sculpture was originally placed in the outside court between two porticoes in Lake Park, Milwaukee. The dedication ceremonies, planned to coincide with the opening of a park pavilion, took place on July 11, 1903. "Judge George H. Noyes made the presentation speech, the bust remaining with the American flag. As Judge Noyes ceased speaking Clauder's Military Band struck up "The Star-Spangled Banner", while Cyril Gordon Weld, the grandson of Mr. Wahl, cut the cord that held the national colors about the bust, and the flag full, disclosing the features of Christian Wahl." The dedication ended with Wahl's widow presented a collection of large palm trees, assembled by the late Wahl, to the park board.

Wahl Park was named in Christian Wahl's honor in 1956, and Wahl's bust was moved there in 1960.

Christian Wahl was recognized during his lifetime. The street leading from the southeast into Lake Park is named Wahl Avenue.

Location history
Christian Wahl was originally sited in Lake Park, in Milwaukee's East Side in 1903. It was moved to Wahl Park, located in Milwaukee's North Side, in 1960.  In September 2020, the Milwaukee County Board changed the name of the park to Harriet Tubman Park in honor of the well-known abolitionist.  The bust remains in Harriet Tubman Park pending a decision on its future location.  The name of the neighborhood and the small creek that runs along the east edge of the park are still named for Wahl.  They are the Wahl Park neighborhood and Wahl Creek, respectively.

Artist

References

Kilmer, Graham, Urban Milwaukee, https://urbanmilwaukee.com/2021/01/07/harriet-tubman-park-unveiled/

External links
Tadeusz Kosciuszko
Major General Sterling Price Monument

Culture of Milwaukee
Outdoor sculptures in Milwaukee
1903 sculptures
Bronze sculptures in Wisconsin
Articles containing video clips
Busts in the United States